Hilary James is a British musician. A vocalist and multi-instrumentalist she plays guitar, double bass, mandobass (bass mandolin) and is a singer, and songwriter. She works mostly with her partner Simon Mayor and with their ensemble the Mandolinquents. Mayor and James originally toured as the duo "Spredthick".

Discography

Hilary James – solo
Burning Sun (1993)
Love, Lust and Loss (1996)
Bluesy (1999)
Laughing with the Moon (2004)
English Sketches (2011)
You Don't Know (2015)

Slim Panatella and the Mellow Virginians 
Slim Panatella and the Mellow Virginians comprised : Hilary James, Simon Mayor and Andy Baum
 Sweet Nicotina (vinyl single) (1988)
 Slim Panatella and the Mellow Virginians ON CD (2001)

Collaboration (for children)
The Collaboration (for children) comprised : Hilary James and Simon Mayor 
 Lullabies with Mandolins    (2004)
 Children's Favourites from Acoustics (2005)
 Gobble! Gobble! Gobble! – Musical Mystery Tour vol 1 (2000)
 Up in a Big Balloon – Musical Mystery Tour vol 2 (2000)
 A BIg Surprise – Musical Mystery Tour vol 3 (2000)
 Snowmen & Kings – Musical Mystery Tour vol 4 (2000)
 Midsummer Market – Musical Mystery Tour vol 5 (2000)

Collaboration (for adults) Mandolinquents
Dance of the Comedians (2007)
Mandolinquents (1997)

Collaboration (for adults) – Simon Mayor and Hilary James
The English Mandolin (2006)
Duos (2001)

Simon Mayor (with Hilary James)
Music from a Small Island (2006)
The Art of Mandolin (2014)

References

External links
Hilary James Official website
 Hilary James & Simon Mayor's music for children Official website
The Mandolinquents Official website
Slim Panatella & the Mellow Virginians Official website
Simon Mayor Official website

British children's musicians
Living people
Year of birth missing (living people)
British mandolinists
British women guitarists